Yoshitora Kawai (1902–1923) was a Japanese communist activist involved with many Tokyo-based political groups.

He attended Honzan hospital's nurse training school, but moved to Tokyo's Kameido district in September 1920 after being exposed to socialism from a professor, Oka Sensei. He was a member of Gyōminkai (Enlightened People's Society), a communist study group, and joined the Nankatsu Labor Union alongside Tanno Setsu. In March 1923, Kawai created the Tokyo Communist Youth League, the first instance of a group openly labeling themselves as Communists. During the 1923 Great Kantō earthquake, Kawai was reported as having rescued three children who had been trapped under a collapsed house.  Amidst the chaos of the earthquake's aftermath, he was captured on 2 September 1923, and a few days later, was killed by police in prison during the Kameido Incident.

References

Japanese communists
1902 births
1923 deaths
Executed communists